Forrest William "Frosty" England (October 29, 1912 – June 25, 2002) was an American football coach and college athletic administrator.  He served as the head football coach at Arkansas State College—now known as Arkansas State University—from 1946 to 1953 and at the University of Toledo  from 1954 to 1955, compiling a career college football record of 57–29–11. England was the author of the book Coaching the T Formation: A Veritable Bible of T Formation Coaching Information for Coaches and Players published in 1948.

England earned a bachelor's degree from Illinois College and a master's degree from the University of Missouri.  After retiring from coaching he had a career in real estate.

Head coaching record

College

References

External links
 

1912 births
2002 deaths
American real estate businesspeople
Arkansas State Red Wolves football coaches
Toledo Rockets athletic directors
Toledo Rockets football coaches
High school football coaches in Illinois
High school football coaches in Missouri
Illinois College alumni
University of Missouri alumni